Tools of Titans: The Tactics, Routines, and Habits of Billionaires, Icons, and World-Class Performers (2016) is a self-help book by Timothy Ferriss, an American writer, educational activist, and entrepreneur. He interviewed more than 100 "world class performers" in diverse fields on their advice for success. The book debuted as a #1 New York Times bestseller.

Arnold Schwarzenegger wrote the foreword.

Content
Ferriss says he noticed common patterns in guests:
 80% of guests had a daily meditation or mindfulness practice
 A number of males (not females) over 45 never eat breakfast, or eat only the scantiest of fare.
 Many use the ChiliPad device.
 Many enjoyed the books Sapiens, Poor Charlie's Almanack, Influence, Man's Search for Meaning.
 Listen to single songs on repeat for focus.
 A form of "spec" work (completing projects on their own time and dime, then submitting them to prospective buyers).
 The belief that "failure is not durable".
 Turned a weakness into an advantage.

Featured guests
Ferriss divides the guests' chapters into three categories: Healthy, Wealthy, Wise.

Part 1: Healthy

Part 2: Wealthy

Part 3: Wise

References

External links
 
 Meet The Titans

2016 non-fiction books
Business books
Self-help books
American non-fiction books
Books by Tim Ferriss
Houghton Mifflin books